This is a list of public art in Gwynedd in north Wales. This list applies only to works of public art on permanent display in an outdoor public space and does not, for example, include artworks in museums.

Abergwyngregyn

Abergynolwyn

Bala

Bangor

Barmouth

Beddgelert

Bethesda

Caernarfon

Corris

Harlech

Llanberis

Llanfrothen

Llanuwchllyn

Llanystumdwy

Maentwrog

Morfa Nefyn

Nefyn

Pennal

Portmeiron

Pwllheli

Trawsfynydd

Y Rhiw

References

Gwynedd
Gwynedd